125th may refer to:

125th Anniversary of the Confederation of Canada Medal, a commemorative medal celebrating the 125th anniversary of the Confederation of Canada
125th Battalion (1st Overseas Battalion of 38th Regiment Dufferin Rifles), CEF, a unit in the Canadian Expeditionary Force during the First World War
125th Delaware General Assembly, a meeting of the Delaware Senate and the Delaware House of Representatives
125th Division (People's Republic of China), a division deployed by the People's Republic of China
125th Fighter Squadron, a unit of the Oklahoma Air National Guard that flies the F-16C Fighting Falcon
125th Fighter Wing (125 FW) is an Air National Guard unit located at Jacksonville International Airport, Florida
125th Illinois Volunteer Infantry Regiment, an infantry regiment in the Union Army during the American Civil War
125th meridian east, a line of longitude 125° east of Greenwich
125th meridian west, a line of longitude 125° west of Greenwich
125th Napier's Rifles, an infantry regiment of the British Indian Army
125th New York Volunteer Infantry Regiment, a volunteer regiment from Rensselaer County, New York, during the American Civil War
125th Ohio Infantry (or 125th OVI) was an infantry regiment in the Union Army during the American Civil War
125th Regiment of Foot, an infantry regiment of the British Army, created in 1794 and disbanded in 1796
125th Special Tactics Squadron, a military organization under the civilian direction of the Oregon Military Department
125th Street (disambiguation)
125th Street (IND Eighth Avenue Line), an express station on the IND Eighth Avenue Line of the New York City Subway
125th Street (IRT Broadway – Seventh Avenue Line), a local station on the IRT Broadway – Seventh Avenue Line of the New York City Subway
125th Street (IRT Lenox Avenue Line), a station on the IRT Lenox Avenue Line of the New York City Subway
125th Street (IRT Lexington Avenue Line), the northernmost Manhattan station on the IRT Lexington Avenue Line of the New York City Subway
125th Street (IRT Ninth Avenue Line), a station on the demolished IRT Ninth Avenue Line
125th Street (IRT Second Avenue Line), a station on the demolished IRT Second Avenue Line
125th Street (IRT Third Avenue Line), a station on the demolished IRT Third Avenue Line
125th Street (Manhattan), an east–west in the New York City borough of Manhattan, the "Main Street" of Harlem
125th Street Bridge, a bridge that crosses the Mississippi River in the U.S. state of Minnesota
125th Street Hudson River bridge, a proposed bridge across the Hudson River 
125th Weather Flight (125th WF) is a combat weather team located at Tulsa International Airport in Tulsa, Oklahoma
Harlem-125th Street (Metro-North station) Metro-North Railroad Following station Grand Central Terminus 
125th Ohio General Assembly, the legislative body of the state of Ohio in 2003 and 2004
Ohio House of Representatives membership, 125th General Assembly, in session in 2003 and 2004
Ohio Senate membership, 125th General Assembly comprised the state legislature of the U.S. state of Ohio
Small Talk at 125th and Lenox, the debut album of soul musician and poet Gil Scott-Heron, released in 1970 on Flying Dutchman Records

See also
125 (number)
AD 125, the year 125 (CXXV) of the Julian calendar